Ameen Faisal is the former National Security Advisor and former Minister of Defence and National Security of the Republic of Maldives.

Political career 
He was a founding member of the Maldivian Democratic Party (MDP). He was active in Major Rallies with the President Mohamed Nasheed, while he was an activist. Ameen resigned on 7 February 2012, with the cabinet of president Mohamed Nasheed tendered televised en masse resignation.

Ameen Faisal played a major role in the then opposition rallies in the presidency of Abdulla Yameen, and was instrumental in the 2018 presidential campaign of the President Ibrahim Mohamed Solih. He was expected to be the Minister of defence in the new coalition government cabinet, but the chairperson of the Maldivian Democratic Party (MDP) Mariya Ahmed Didi was appointed.

References

Government ministers of the Maldives
Living people
1963 births